Valea Danului is a commune in Argeș County, Muntenia, Romania. It is composed of five villages: Bănicești, Bolculești, Borobănești, Valea Danului and Vernești.

References

Communes in Argeș County
Localities in Muntenia